Fernando Ribeiro da Silva (born 4 August 1950) is a Portuguese chess champion who earned the title of International Master in 1975.
Silva won the Portuguese Chess Championship in 1975, 1976, 1977, 1981 and 1987.

References

External links
 
 

1950 births
Living people
Portuguese chess players
Chess International Masters